Palystes is a genus of huntsman spiders, commonly called rain spiders or lizard-eating spiders, occurring in Africa, India, Australia, and the Pacific. The most common and widespread species is P. superciliosus, found in South Africa, home to 12 species in the genus. The name Palystes is derived from either the Latin palaestes or the Greek palaistes, meaning "wrestler". The genus was first described by Ludwig Carl Christian Koch in 1875.

Build
Palystes species are large spiders, with a body length of 15–36 mm, and a leg span up to 110 mm. Their top side is covered in tan to dark tan velvety setae (hairs). The underside of their legs is banded in colour, and their legs and abdomens may be interspersed with slightly longer setae. They have a large moustachial stripe below their front eyes, and extending down their fangs.

Habits
While Palystes species mostly hunt insects on plants, they commonly enter houses before rain, or during the summer, where they  prey on geckos (usually Afrogecko porphyreus in the Western Cape, or Lygodactylus capensis in the eastern parts of southern Africa). Males are regularly seen from August to December, probably looking for females.

The large, round egg sacs of P. castaneus and P. superciliosus are commonly seen from about November to April. After mating in the early summer, the female makes a 60- to 100-mm sac out of silk, with twigs and leaves woven into it. She constructs the sac over 3–5 hours, then aggressively guards it until the spiderlings, which hatch inside the protective sac, chew their way out about three weeks later. Females  construct about three of these egg sacs over their two-year lives. Many gardeners are bitten by protective Palystes mothers during this period.

Venom
The size of Palystes spiders, combined with the banding on the underside of the legs exposed when the spider is in threat pose, give them a fearsome appearance. An experiment was done in 1959 where a P. superciliosus was allowed to bite an adult guinea pig on the nose. The guinea pig died within 7 minutes, leading to a belief that the spider's venom was dangerous. However, further research on anaesthetized guinea pigs showed that the original guinea pig had actually died of shock, rather than as a result of the spider's venom. In humans a Palystes bite is no more dangerous than a bee sting. It causes a burning sensation, and swelling which lasts for a few days. Recovery is spontaneous and complete.

Wasps
Palystes spiders are also commonly seen paralysed, being dragged by a large wasp called a pompilid or spider wasp. Sometimes, the wasp is not present. Pompilid wasps only hunt spiders, which they paralyse by stinging them. They then drag the spider back to their nest where they lay an egg on the spider, then seal the spider and the egg in. When the egg hatches, the larva eats the paralysed spider, keeping the spider alive as long as possible by eating peripheral flesh first, and saving the vital organs till last. By doing this, the spider stays fresh long enough for the wasp larva to mature and pupate. The pompilid wasp species Tachypompilus ignitus is at least largely a specialist hunter of mature Palystes females.

Species
 according to The World Spider Catalog, Version 23.5: it contains twenty species
 Palystes ansiedippenaarae Croeser, 1996 — South Africa
 Palystes castaneus Latreille, 1819 — South Africa
 Palystes convexus Strand, 1907 — Madagascar
 Palystes crawshayi Pocock, 1902 — Lesotho
 Palystes ellioti Pocock, 1896 — Central, East Africa
 Palystes fornasinii Pavesi, 1881 — Mozambique
 Palystes hoehneli Simon, 1890 — Kenya, Tanzania
 Palystes johnstoni Pocock, 1896 — Botswana, Zimbabwe, Malawi, Mozambique, Uganda
 Palystes karooensis Croeser, 1996 — South Africa
 Palystes kreutzmanni Jäger & Kunz, 2010 — South Africa 
 Palystes leppanae Pocock, 1902 — South Africa
 Palystes leroyorum Croeser, 1996 — South Africa
 Palystes lunatus Pocock, 1896 — South Africa
 Palystes martinfilmeri Croeser, 1996 — South Africa
 Palystes perornatus Pocock, 1900 — South Africa
 Palystes pinnotheres Walckenaer, 1805 — New South Wales, New Caledonia
 Palystes reticulatus Rainbow, 1899 — Santa Cruz Islands
 Palystes stilleri Croeser, 1996 — South Africa
 Palystes stuarti Croeser, 1996 — South Africa
 Palystes superciliosus L. Koch, 1875 — Southern Africa

Gallery

References

External links
 Palystes (rain spiders, lizard-eating spiders) on Iziko Museums' Biodiversity Explorer

Sparassidae
Araneomorphae genera
Spiders of Africa
Spiders of Asia
Spiders of Oceania